Monks, Girls and Hungarian Soldiers is a 1952 West German historical adventure comedy film directed by Ferdinand Dörfler and starring Joe Stöckel, Paul Hartmann and Rudolf Fernau. It was made at the Bavaria Studios in Munich. The film's sets were designed by Ludwig Reiber. Some shooting was also done at Nymphenburg Palace.

Cast

See also
 Nockherberg

References

Bibliography

External links 
 

1952 films
1950s historical comedy films
German historical comedy films
West German films
1950s German-language films
Films directed by Ferdinand Dörfler
Films set in the 18th century
Works set in monasteries
Films about beer
Films shot at Bavaria Studios
1952 comedy films
German black-and-white films
1950s German films